Paracoptops basalis is a species of beetle in the family Cerambycidae. It was described by Francis Polkinghorne Pascoe in 1865, originally under the genus Agelasta.

References

Mesosini
Beetles described in 1865